The 1932 Tunis Grand Prix was a Grand Prix motor race held at the Carthage Street Circuit in Tunis, the capital of colonial Tunisia, on 17 April 1932. Achille Varzi, in a privateer Bugatti, won the 37-lap race ahead of fellow Bugatti driver Marcel Lehoux, with Philippe Étancelin, in an Alfa Romeo, claiming third position. The leading drivers in the voiturette class were Louis Joly, Pierre Veyron and Luigi Castelbarco.

Entries

 Pink background denotes entries in the voiturette class.

Starting grid
Grid positions were allocated in numerical order.

 Pink background denotes entries in the voiturette class.

Classification

Race

 Pink background denotes entries in the voiturette class.

References

Tunis
1932 in African sport
Tunis
Motorsport in Tunisia